Sadaqat Hussain is a Pakistani politician who has been a member of the Provincial Assembly of Sindh since August 2018.

Political career

He was elected to the Provincial Assembly of Sindh as a candidate of Muttahida Qaumi Movement – Pakistan from Constituency PS-117 (Karachi West-VI) in 2018 Pakistani general election.

On 26 January 2022, Hussein was beaten and arrested during a protest in Karachi.

References

Living people
Muttahida Qaumi Movement MPAs (Sindh)
Year of birth missing (living people)